Conus maldivus, common name the Maldive cone, is a species of sea snail, a marine gastropod mollusk in the family Conidae, the cone snails, cone shells or cones.

These snails are predatory and venomous. They are capable of "stinging" humans.

Description
The size of the shell varies between 18 mm and 83 mm.
The shell is encircled by distant revolving lines of small spots. It is sometimes irregularly clouded with white, not forming bands. At other times it is irregularly banded.

Distribution
This marine species occurs in the Red Sea and in the Western Indian Ocean off the Mascarene Basin, the Maldives and Sri Lanka.

References

 Deshayes, G. P., 1863 Catalogue des mollusques de l'Ile de la Réunion (Bourbon), p. 144 p, 14 pls
 Tucker J.K. & Tenorio M.J. (2009) Systematic classification of Recent and fossil conoidean gastropods. Hackenheim: Conchbooks. 296 pp.
 Puillandre N., Duda T.F., Meyer C., Olivera B.M. & Bouchet P. (2015). One, four or 100 genera? A new classification of the cone snails. Journal of Molluscan Studies. 81: 1-23

External links
 To World Register of Marine Species
 Cone Shells - Knights of the Sea
 
 Holotype in MNHN, Paris

maldivus
Gastropods described in 1792